The list of ship launches in 1933 includes a chronological list of some ships launched in 1933.

References 

Sources

1933
Ship launches